Caird is a surname and may refer to:

 Edward Caird, Scottish philosopher
 G. B. Caird, Biblical scholar
 James Caird (disambiguation)
 John Caird (disambiguation)
 Maureen Caird, Australian athlete
 Mona Caird, English novelist and essayist

See also
 Messrs Caird & Company of Greenock, a Scottish shipbuilding and engineering firm (1828-1916)
 Card (disambiguation)

Scottish surnames
Scottish Gaelic-language surnames